Devadas is a 2018 Indian Telugu-language action comedy film produced by C. Ashwini Dutt under Vyjayanthi Movies banner and directed by Sriram Adittya. The film stars Nagarjuna Akkineni, Nani, Aakanksha Singh, and Rashmika Mandanna with music composed by Mani Sharma. It was released on 27 September 2018.
The remake of this film, which will be directed by Aanand L. Rai like Arjun aur Vicky.

Plot 
M. K. Das is a M. S. holder, who joins Medimax, a corporate hospital in Hyderabad, as one of the surgeons designated to work in the mortuary. Four days later, he attends a patient whose medication was prescribed by his senior Dr. Bharadwaj. Noticing improper medication, Das asks for a change in prescription without prior approval from Bharadwaj. Though the patient recovers, Bharadwaj fires Das from the job on the grounds of unprofessional behavior due to ego. With no option left, Das starts a clinic in his locality at the dilapidated Shantabhai Memorial Charity Hospital. Meanwhile, the cops are searching for a crime boss named Deva, whose identity is unknown. Deva returns to Hyderabad after the death of his mentor and foster father Dada, who was killed by his rival David.

Dada's son Ajay helped David in the murder and earns Deva's ire. One day, Deva is injured in a shootout between his gang and the cops and escapes from the scene hiding his identity successfully, where he enters Shantabhai Memorial Charity Hospital and Das treats him. Das later realizes that his patient is a crime boss, but chooses not to reveal his identity to avoid a breach of trust, which is part of Das's profession. Deva is impressed with Das's honesty and naivety and befriends him by calling him as "Gold" (mocking the gold medal he won for being a university topper in M. S.). Deva and his men renovate the clinic and the inflow of patients increases. As Das gets busy as a practicing physician, he is equally baffled by the number of gangsters and criminals surrounding him daily.

Das also falls in love with Pooja, unaware that she is an undercover cop working on Deva's case. Meanwhile, Deva reveals that he had feelings for Jahnvi, a journalist, which were never communicated. As Das makes attempts to bring Deva and Jahnvi together (by posing him as a CBI officer), Deva finds himself more "humanized". In an attempt to arrest Deva, Pooja asks Das to bring him to a meet at a restaurant for dinner. As Pooja waits there along with the cops, Deva learns Ajay's whereabouts and kills him. Das witness the murder and questions Deva's lack of humanity and leaves, rejoining Medimax after promising to organize a successful organ donation camp. Deva is left heartbroken due to the rift caused by his friendship and meets a child at a party, who is aware of his identity.

The child asks Deva to scare death as he is dying soon due to blood cancer. Deva arranges for his treatment, but the child dies. With Deva's help, the organ donation camp at Medimax turns successful, which brings a change in Bharadwaj's opinion on Das. The child's death depresses Deva, who calls Jahnvi to arrange a live telecast and reveals his identity as the crime boss for whom the cops are searching, and credits Das for providing a change in him. However, he receives a call from David, who kidnapped Das and asks him to meet in private for one last time. Deva arrives at David's place and the cops follow them. In the shootout that ensues, Deva sustains near−fatal injuries. With the help of Bharadwaj, Das and two other surgeons fake Deva's death. Deva and Das enjoy a holiday on a cruise along with Jahnvi and Pooja.

Cast 

Nagarjuna Akkineni as Deva
Nani as Dr. M. K. Das
Rashmika Mandanna as Inspector Pooja
Aakanksha Singh as Reporter Jahnavi
Sarathkumar as Dada, Deva's foster father (guest appearance)
Kunal Kapoor as David
Naveen Chandra as Ajay, Dada's son
Naresh as Mohan, Das's brother
Satya Krishnan as Das's sister-in-law
Murali Sharma as Police Officer Murali Sharma
Rao Ramesh as Dr. Bharadwaj
Vennela Kishore as Dr. Kuchipudi, a psychiatrist
Srinivas Avasarala as Rajan, Deva's personal assistant
Manobala as Tata Rao, Pooja's assistant
Aishwarya as Fishfry Lakshmi
Sivannarayana Naripeddi as Pooja's father
Prabhakar as Deva's henchman
Prudhviraj as Jahnavi's manager
Raghu Karumanchi as Local Rowdy
Prabhas Sreenu as Seenu, David's henchmen
Sameer as Doctor
Uttej as Raju, Seetharamayya's driver
Satya as Jacket, Das's clinic compounder
Sampoornesh Babu as Actor (cameo appearance)
S. P. Balasubrahmanyam as Medimax Hospital Chairman Seetharamayya (cameo appearance)

Production
Devdas was the first film to be shot in Hyderabad Metro.

Soundtrack
The film's music was composed by Mani Sharma and on Aditya Music label. The Audio launch was held on 21 September 2018, on the occasion of legendary ANR's birthday anniversary between in the presence of industry stalwarts. Sify termed the album lackluster, stating that although "Vaaru Veeru", "Chettu Kinda Doctor", and "Emo Emo" were good songs, the rest were lacking when it came to Mani Sharma's expectations.

Release
Devadas was released on 27 September 2018. It is dubbed in Tamil under the same title and in Hindi as Don Aur Doctor by Zee Studios in November 2019.

Critical reception 
The movie received positive reviews from critics.The Times of India rated the film 3.5 stars and said, "Devadas certainly has its moments with some cracking humour and solid performances by its two stars. A tad too long, with some avoidable melodrama and a weak climax prove to be troublesome, but it doesn't take it away from a hilarious first half which makes it worth your while. If you're somebody who enjoys Nani's brand of humour - Devadas is a must-watch." The News Minute wrote, "All this leaves you wishing that the director, for a brief moment, had realised the pot of gold he had at his disposal. It displays a certain brash level of amateurishness if your actual comedians in the movie, the sidekicks, almost get as much screen time as your protagonists. Food for thought! So, if you want to watch a comedy featuring Nani, watch it. Don’t watch if you are hoping for an ‘action’ comedy."

Sify gave the film three stars and stated that "DevaDas has a not-so-engaging story. But the comedy works very well in the first half. The second half falters with many dull moments. A violent don becoming a good man is an oversimplification. Nice technical output needs a pat." The Hindu criticized the film for poorly etched characters and wrote, "Despite all this, if Devadas holds attention, it’s because Sriram Adittya knows how to utilise its two leading actors and serve up plenty of fun moments. In the end, he gets Deva and Das to look at life from each other’s perspectives with some melodrama." Deccan Chronicle gave the film three stars and said that it was "Nag and Nani's show all the way".

Awards and nominations

References

External links 
 

2010s Telugu-language films
Indian action comedy films
Films scored by Mani Sharma
Indian gangster films
2018 action comedy films
Films shot in Hyderabad, India
Films directed by Sriram Adittya